Nadoveza is a Croatian and Serbian surname.

Notable people with the surname include:

 Petar Nadoveza, Croatian footballer
 Branko Nadoveza, Serbian footballer

Croatian surnames
Serbian surnames